Asnotikar Anand Vasant is an Indian politician. He was elected to the Karnataka Legislative Assembly from Karwar in the 2008 Karnataka Legislative Assembly election as a member of the Indian National Congress.

References

External links
 Anand Vasant Asnotikar

Living people
Janata Dal (Secular) politicians
Karnataka MLAs 2008–2013
Year of birth missing (living people)
Indian National Congress politicians
Bharatiya Janata Party politicians from Karnataka
Indian National Congress politicians from Karnataka